Kunstmuseum Luzern (Museum of Art Lucerne), is an art museum founded in 1932, and is located within the Lucerne Culture and Congress Centre (or KKL Luzern). It is one of the most important art museums in Switzerland known for its temporary rotating exhibitions of all genres, including contemporary art.

History 

The Art Society Lucerne was founded in 1819 with the aim of creating a forum for artists and citizens interested in art and providing them with premises for exhibitions. In 1932, the Kunstmuseum Luzern moved into the Kunst- und Kongresshaus building (nicknamed Meili-Bau) built by Armin Meili (1892–1981), which was expanded in the 1970s.

Since 1982, the Kunstmuseum Luzern has represented Lucerne and the Canton of Lucerne at the Manor Cultural Prize, held once every two years.  

In 1991 the Meili-designed building was demolished. From 1996 to 1998, the Lucerne Culture and Congress Center KKL was constructed on the same site, designed by the French architect Jean Nouvel. In 2001, the museum was moved into the newly designed Kunst- und Kongresshaus building.

About 
The Kunstmuseum Luzern is located on the 4th floor of the Lucerne Culture and Congress Centre (or KKL Luzern) in Lucerne. The art collection of the Kunstmuseum Luzern sees itself as a "cultural archive of the Central Switzerland region" and houses several thousand objects from the Renaissance to the present-day. The museum shows five to eight temporary exhibitions per year, featuring artists of both Swiss and international origins. Past exhibitions have reached an audience of 30,000 to 50,000 people. 

Fanni Fetzer serves as the museum director since 1 October 2011.

See also 

 List of contemporary art museums

References

External links 

 Official website

Art museums and galleries in Switzerland
1959 establishments in Switzerland
Museums in Lucerne